The table below lists the judgments of the Constitutional Court of South Africa delivered in 2016.

The members of the court at the start of 2016 were Chief Justice Mogoeng Mogoeng, Deputy Chief Justice Dikgang Moseneke, and judges Edwin Cameron, Johan Froneman, Chris Jafta, Sisi Khampepe, Mbuyiseli Madlanga, Nonkosi Mhlantla, Bess Nkabinde, Johann van der Westhuizen and Raymond Zondo. Deputy Chief Justice Moseneke retired in May and Justice Nkabinde was appointed as Acting DCJ. Ronnie Bosielo, Elias Matojane, Boissie Mbha, Cagney Musi, Robert Nugent and Malcolm Wallis sat as acting judges on judgments delivered in this year.

References

 

2016
Constitutional Court